Juan Carlos Alarcón García (born October 27, 1971) is a Venezuelan actor. He was born in Mérida, Venezuela. He is internationally known for his role as the maternal uncle of Juana Pérez in Radio Caracas Televisión's soap Juana la Virgen.

Filmography

Telenovelas
Que el cielo me explique RCTV as Carlos Patiño
Nadie me Dira Como Quererte RCTV (2008) as Cesar Leal
Camaleona RCTV (2007) 
Amantes RCTV (2005) as Camilo
La Cuaima RCTV (2003)
Juana la virgen RCTV (2002)
Viva la Pepa RCTV (2001)
Hay Amores que Matan RCTV (2000)
Aunque me Cueste la Vida RCTV (1998)
María de los Ángeles RCTV (1997)
La Inolvidable RCTV (1996)
Ilusiones RCTV (1995)

Movies
DESAUTORIZADO ( 2010) as Federico
Asesinato en lunes de carnaval / Hounded on a Carnival Monday (2002)
Oro Diablo / Devil Gold (2000)
Manuela Sáenz (2000)
Fosa Común (1998)

TV Series
Cinco de chocolate y una de fresa / Five of chocolate and one of strawberry - VTV (1989)

Theater Play 

 Actos indecentes  ( 2010)
 Los Navegaos ( 2006)

References

Juan Carlos Alarcón in VenCOR

Living people
People from Mérida, Mérida
RCTV personalities
Venezuelan male film actors
Venezuelan male telenovela actors
Venezuelan male television actors
1971 births